Tukere Barlow is a New Zealand former professional rugby league footballer who played for Warrington and represented New Zealand Māori.

Playing career
In 1993 Barlow played for the Hamilton City Tigers, who won the Waikato Rugby League Grand Final. He was also selected to play for Waikato.

With the launch of the Lion Red Cup in 1994, Barlow joined the Waikato Cougars and scored 12 tries for the club in its first season. Barlow then spent the off season in England with the Warrington Wolves before returning for the 1995 Lion Red Cup season. Tukere Barlow played  in Warrington's 10-40 defeat by Wigan in the 1994–95 Regal Trophy Final during the 1994–95 season at Alfred McAlpine Stadium, Huddersfield on Saturday 28 January 1995.

In 1997 he joined the Mangere East Hawks in the Auckland Rugby League competition, the Hawks lost the grand final but Barlow won the competition's Best and Fairest award. Barlow then returned to Waikato, captaining the side to a Grand Final and Rugby League Cup win over Canterbury.

In 1998 Barlow again led Waikato in the New Zealand Rugby League's National Provincial Competition.

In 1999 Barlow, while playing for Otahuhu, made one appearance for Auckland South before moving to Australia and joining the Kellyville Bush Rangers in the Metropolitan Cup.

Representative career
Barlow represented the New Zealand Māori during his long career, making his début in 1992 during the Māori Queen's coronation celebrations. He also played at the 1992 Pacific Cup and against the Great Britain touring side in 1996. His last appearance also came against Great Britain, in 1999.

References

1970s births
Auckland rugby league team players
Hamilton City Tigers players
Junior Kiwis players
Living people
Mangere East Hawks players
New Zealand Māori rugby league players
New Zealand Māori rugby league team captains
New Zealand Māori rugby league team players
New Zealand rugby league players
New Zealand expatriate sportspeople in England
Northern Districts rugby league team players
Otahuhu Leopards players
Rugby league hookers
Waikato rugby league team players
Warrington Wolves players